John Henry, an American Legend is a 1965 children's picture book by American author and illustrator Ezra Jack Keats In this book, it shows that John Henry, a hard working miner tries to beat the steam drill. He used a 20-pound hammer against a steam drill. Whoever won would get 100 dollars and new clothes. In the end John Henry won the competition, but he also broke inside. He puts his hammer on top of his chest and dies in honor. "A man ain't nothin' but a man".

Disney retelling
Disney retold the story in Disney's American Legends. In the story, John Henry was born into slavery but when he and his wife were freed by the Emancipation Proclamation, his wife had their chains forged into a 20-pound hammer. John used the hammer to join with railroad workers who were told if they finished building the railroad line they would be rewarded with land of their own. The workers are replaced by a steam drill, which causes their contracts for land to be voided. John challenges the drill to a contest of speed to lay the rest of the tracks, and if he wins, the workers will still get the land. He inevitably wins but the effort kills him, and he dies with his hammer in his hand, like he told his wife he would. The story was narrated by his wife to their child after John's death.

1965 children's books
American picture books
Books by Ezra Jack Keats